The following is a list of all team-to-team transactions that have occurred in the National Hockey League during the 2003–04 NHL season.  It lists what team each player has been traded to, or claimed by, and for which players or draft picks, if applicable.

October

November

December

January

February

March

March 9 – Trade deadline

See also
2003–04 NHL season
2003 NHL Entry Draft
2003 in sports
2004 in sports

References
ESPN.com 2003–04 Trade Tracker
hockeydb.com

National Hockey League transactions
Trans